Oropsylla is a genus of fleas, most of which are ectoparasites of rodents and other mammals.

Species 
 Oropsylla alaskensis
 Oropsylla arctomys
 Oropsylla bruneri
 Oropsylla eatoni
 Oropsylla hirsuta
 Oropsylla idahoensis
 Oropsylla ilovaiskii
 Oropsylla labis
 Oropsylla montana
 Oropsylla oregonensis
 Oropsylla rupestris
 Oropsylla silantiewi
 Oropsylla tapina
 Oropsylla tuberculata
 Oropsylla washingtonensis

References 

Siphonaptera genera
Ceratophyllidae
Parasitic arthropods of mammals